Santiago is an album by The Chieftains, released through RCA Records in 1996. The album is dedicated to traditional music of Galicia, the region in the northwest of Spain, and also adaptation of Galician emigrants' musical folklore in Latin American music, for example, in the music of Mexico and Cuba. As Paddy Moloney noted in the CD's booklet, Galicia is "the world's most undiscovered Celtic country".

The album features collaborations with Carlos Núñez, Linda Ronstadt, Los Lobos, Ry Cooder, Eliot Fisk, Richard Egües, Pancho Amat, Kepa Junkera, Júlio Pereira, (among others). In 1997, the album earned the group the Grammy Award for Best World Music Album.

Track listing

Personnel
Derek Bell - harp, tiompán, harpsichord
Martin Fay - fiddle
Seán Keane - fiddle
Kevin Conneff - bodhrán, vocals
Matt Molloy - flute
Paddy Moloney - uilleann pipes, tin whistle

References

1996 albums
Grammy Award for Best World Music Album
RCA Records albums
The Chieftains albums
Collaborative albums